Luis Antonio Mendoza Castro (born August 21, 1973) is a Mexican football manager and former player.

Career
Born in Villa Guerrero, State of Mexico, Mendoza made his professional debut with Deportivo Toluca F.C. in 1990.

Mendoza became the manager of Ascenso MX side Murciélagos F.C. in 2017.

References

External links

1973 births
Living people
Association football midfielders
Deportivo Toluca F.C. players
Liga MX players
Mexican football managers
Footballers from the State of Mexico
Mexican footballers